Stephen Jimenez is an American journalist, TV producer and author of The Book of Matt.

Personal life
Jimenez, who is gay, came out in the 1970s.  He marched in the first National March on Washington for Lesbian and Gay Rights, which took place in 1979. He is a graduate of Georgetown University. He lives in Brooklyn and Santa Fe, NM.  Jimenez is also known as Steve Jimenez.

Awards and recognition
In 2006, Jimenez won that year's Writers Guild Award for Analysis, Feature or Commentary, together with Richard Gerdau and Glenn Silber, for the ABC report "The Matthew Shepherd Story; Secrets of a Murder (20/20)". In 2005, he shared with Silber and with Elizabeth Vargas a Mongerson Prize for Investigative Reporting on the News Award of Distinction from the Medill School of Journalism for work done for ABC's 20/20. Some police officials interviewed after Jimenez's book's publication disputed certain claims made in the book. Dave O'Malley, the Laramie police commander over the investigations division at the time of Shepard's murder, said Jimenez's claim that Shepard was "a methamphetamine kingpin is almost humorous. Someone that would buy into that certainly would believe almost anything they read." Other police, such as the officer who found the murder weapon, believed it was a drug-related killing.

Rob Debree, lead sheriff's investigator at the time, said the book contains "factual errors and lies", and deemed Jimenez's claim that Shepard was a drug dealer "truly laughable".

Career
Jimenez directed and produced for WTXF-TV the 1995 documentary Yearbook: The Class of '65, documenting Philadelphia's Thomas Edison High School graduating class of 1965, which is believed to have suffered an unusually high number of casualties in the Vietnam war.

He is a co-founder of the advocacy group New Yorkers Against Hidden Predators.  The group seeks for the "Child Victims Act" to be passed which Jimenez has promoted for over ten years.

Jimenez is a trustee of the Ucross Foundation.

He has written for Daily Beast, Medium, the New York Post, Byliner and Out.

The Book of Matt

In 2013 Jimenez published The Book of Matt, an analysis of the murder of Matthew Shephard.  Jimenez first visited Laramie shortly after the murder, planning to write a screenplay and believing that the murder was a straightforward homophobic killing. Jimenez spent 13 years researching the murder, and came to the conclusion that Matthew and one of the men convicted of his murder were involved in the illegal trade in crystal meth.
Jimenez has said his motivation for writing the book as a desire to show that "the popular narrative (of homophobic murder) served a purpose, but it’s only one thread of a bigger, richer, more challenging story whose lessons we have barely learned. To avoid topics of addiction, including how crystal meth ravaged the queer community (and Matt’s life), is not helpful to anyone."

References 

American male journalists
Living people
Georgetown University alumni
People from Brooklyn
American LGBT journalists
American gay writers
Television producers from New York City
Year of birth missing (living people)